The Bica Funicular, sometimes known as the Elevador da Bica (Bica Lift), is a funicular railway line in the civil parish of Misericórdia, in the municipality of Lisbon, Portugal. It connects the Rua de São Paulo with Calçada do Combro/Rua do Loreto, operated by Carris.

The line conforms to the funicular principle, with two cars permanently attached to opposite ends of a haulage cable, which is looped over a pulley at the upper end of the track. Unusually, traction is provided by electric motors on the two cars, which are themselves powered through an overhead wire. The cable links the two cars together so that they ascend and descend simultaneously, each car acting as a counterweight for the other one.

History

In 1888, the municipality of Lisbon celebrated a contract with the Nova Companhia dos Ascensores de Lisboa providing them a concession to the installation of a lift system that connected the Rua da Bica de Duarte Belo to the Rua de São Paulo along the Largo do Calhariz. The project was conceived by Raoul Mesnier du Ponsard. The mechanical motor of the elevator was installed in 1890, after the conclusion of the public work. However, the lift only began functioning on 28 June 1892, after a couple of years of tests.

In 1912, the Nova Companhia dos Ascensores Mecânicos de Lisboa signed a new contract with the municipality, allowing it to expand the electrification of all the lines. Between 1914 and 1916, the project to automate the transport system using electrical systems was completed. Unfortunately, during the conclusions of the process there was an accident with one of the cars, which became uncontrollable and crashed into the Rua de São Paulo lower station, resulting in its complete destruction. As a result, the funicular transport became inoperable for the next few years.

In 1923, the municipal council demanded that company return the Bica lift to operation, forcing it to work on the line and install new cars, provided by the firm of Theodore Bell. After the dissolution of the Nova Companhia dos Ascensores Mecânicos de Lisboa the lift became the property of Companhia Carris (or, simply, Carris). In 1927, the funicular returned to operation.

On 29 September 2005, it was proposed that the funicular be included in the Special Protection Zone by the DRCLVTejo. In 2009 the dispatch was approved by the Minister of Culture, and on 20 May 2011, the declaration was ratified that classified the lift with the architectural protection zone (Diário da República, 874/2011, Série-2, 98).

On 10 January 2022, the funicular closed for approximately six months for conservation and restoration work.

Architecture

The funicular system is situated on the edge of the Pombaline downtown area of Lisbon overlooking the Tagus River, implanted along an axis dominated by an accentuated slope. Its course follows an area of predominantly rental buildings constructed during the 18th century, .

The lift includes two cars that travel the distance simultaneously in opposite directions. The cars have three doors on either side (with two flanked windows per door), and three compartments within the platform, with wooden seats oriented transversely from the central body.

The transit system includes the Rua da Bica, Largo de Santo Antoninho and Travessa da Bica Grande. The Bica funicular, much like the Funicular of Lavra and the Glória Funicular, originally used to be moved by the Tramway system: using cable and water weights, with the cars equipped with water tanks. The system, today, is electrically operated. The lower station is almost hidden behind a facade on the Rua de S. Paulo with the inscription Ascensor da Bica.

The facade is framed in stonework, with gates of wrought iron and portico with arch. The upper floors include rectangular windows, with the first and second floors including wrought iron varandas and the third floor with smaller picture windows. At the top a decorative cornice divides the upper floor from the Mansard roof, with wrought iron railing. In the interior, is a small atrium with circulation corridor for the cars; with tile wainscoting, plastered walls and azulejo tile the main platform is delimited by wrought iron gate and lateral staircases.

See also 
 Ascensor da Glória
 List of funicular railways

References

Notes

Sources

External links
 www.carris.pt

Transport in Lisbon
Ascensor Bica
Ascensor Bica
National monuments in Lisbon District
Misericórdia